The 1932 Open Championship was the 67th Open Championship, held 8–10 June at Prince's Golf Club in Sandwich, England. Gene Sarazen won his only Open title, five strokes ahead of runner-up  Sarazen led wire-to-wire to secure the fifth of his seven major championships.

Qualifying took place on 6–7 June, Monday and Tuesday, with 18 holes at Prince's and 18 holes at Royal St George's, and the top 100 and ties qualified. Bob Bradbeer led the qualifiers on 141; the qualifying score was 157 and 110 players 

Sarazen opened with a 70 on Wednesday to take the lead, one stroke ahead of four others. He followed with a 69 for 139 (–5) for a three-stroke lead over Percy Alliss after 36 holes. The top sixty and ties would make the 36-hole cut; it was at 154 (+10) and 64 players advanced.

With a 70 in the third round on Friday morning, Sarazen increased his lead to four over Arthur Havers, who shot a course-record  A 74 in the final round that afternoon saw Sarazen post an Open record 283 total. Havers, playing well behind Sarazen, needed a 69 to win, but made the turn in 37 and could not close the gap. He could only manage a 76 for 289 and fell to third; Smith shot 71-70 to climb into solo second place at even-par 288.

Two weeks later in New York, Sarazen won the U.S. Open and joined Bobby Jones (1926, 1930) as the only two to win both the British Open and U.S. Open in the same year. Subsequent winners of both were Ben Hogan (1953), Lee Trevino (1971), Tom Watson (1982), and Tiger Woods (2000).

This was the only Open Championship held at Prince's, just north of Royal St George's, which has since been the only venue in southeastern England to host.

Past champions in the field

Made the cut 

Source:

Missed the cut 

Source:

Did not advance past qualifying rounds (Monday & Tuesday):

Sandy Herd (1902) 161, Harry Vardon (1896, 1898, 1899, 1903, 1911, 1914) 165,James Braid (1901, 1905, 1906, 1908, 1910) 166.

Did not enter:
Bobby Jones (1926, 1927, 1930), Walter Hagen (1922, 1924, 1928, 1929),Jim Barnes (1925), Jock Hutchison (1921).

Round summaries

First round
Wednesday, 8 June 1932

Source:

Second round
Thursday, 9 June 1932

Source:

Third round
Friday, 10 June 1932 (morning)

Source:

Final round
Friday, 10 June 1932 (afternoon)

Source:

Amateurs: Hope (+11), Torrance (+13), Hartley (+14), Munn (+15), Tulloch (+16), Bentley (+18), Sweeny (+19), McRuvie (+21).

References

External links
Prince's 1932 (Official site)

The Open Championship
Golf tournaments in England
Open Championship
Open Championship
Open Championship